Winsor is a surname. Notable people with the surname include:

Charles P. Winsor (1895-1951), engineer-turned-physiologist-turned-biostatistician
Frederick Albert Winsor, gaslight pioneer
Justin Winsor, American writer and historian
Jacqueline Winsor, American sculptor
Kathleen Winsor, romance novelist
Mulford Winsor (1874 – 1956), American newspaperman 
Tom Winsor, British lawyer and economic regulator